The 1974 Hawaii Rainbow Warriors football team represented the University of Hawaiʻi at Mānoa as an independent during the 1974 NCAA Division I football season. In their first season under head coach Larry Price, the Rainbow Warriors compiled a 6–5 record.

Schedule

References

Hawaii
Hawaii Rainbow Warriors football seasons
Hawaii Rainbow Warriors football